Topçam Dam may refer to:

 Topçam Dam (Aydın), a dam in Turkey
 Topçam Dam (Ordu), a dam in Turkey